Herbert E. Klarman (December 21, 1916 – June 17, 1999) was an American/Polish health economist. He was a professor at Johns Hopkins University, State University of New York, and New York University. He was the recipient of a Guggenheim Fellowship in 1976.

Biography 
Klarman was born in Chmielnik, Poland and emigrated to New York City in 1929. He graduated from James Monroe High School and earned his bachelor's degree in economics from Columbia University in 1939 and his doctorate in public finance from the University of Wisconsin in 1946. Klarman was the author of numerous articles and books on the economics of healthcare and was considered a "leading authority" on the economics of healthcare. His 1965 book The Economics of Health, which was commissioned by the Ford Foundation, is considered a significant early piece of literature on how standard economic principles could be applied to medical care.

His students included David Guzick, former president of University of Florida Health.

Publications

Most cited journal articles
 Klarman, H.E. and Rosenthal, G.D., 1968. Cost effectiveness analysis applied to the treatment of chronic renal disease. Medical care, 6(1), pp. 48–54. Jstor (Cited 454 times, according to Google Scholar  ) 
Klarman, H.E., 1974. Application of cost-benefit analysis to the health services and the special case of technologic innovation. International Journal of Health Services, 4(2), pp. 325–352. [Klarman, H.E., 1974. Application of cost-benefit analysis to the health services and the special case of technologic innovation. International Journal of Health Services, 4(2), pp. 325–352. Jstor] (Cited 109 times, according to Google Scholar.)  
Klarman, H.E., 1967. Present status of cost-benefit analysis in the health field. American Journal of Public Health and the Nations Health, 57(11), pp. 1948–1953. [Klarman, H.E., 1967. Present status of cost-benefit analysis in the health field. American Journal of Public Health and the Nations Health, 57(11), pp. 1948–1953.] (open access)  (Cited 90 times, according to Google Scholar.)  
Klarman, H.E., 1982. The road to cost-effectiveness analysis. The Milbank Memorial Fund Quarterly. Health and Society, pp. 585–603.  (open access) (Cited 50 times, according to Google Scholar.)

Personal life 
Klarman died on June 17, 1999, from lymphoma at Union Memorial Hospital in Baltimore. He is the father of billionaire investor Seth Klarman and constitutional law professor Michael Klarman.

References 

1916 births
1999 deaths
Johns Hopkins University faculty
State University of New York faculty
New York University faculty
Columbia College (New York) alumni
University of Wisconsin alumni
20th-century American economists
American people of Polish-Jewish descent
Members of the National Academy of Medicine